Shimao is a Neolithic archaeological site in Shaanxi, China.

Shimao may also refer to
 Shimao, Chipwi, a village in northern Burma
 Shimao Group, a property development company in Shanghai
 Toshio Shimao (1917–1986), a Japanese novelist